A total lunar eclipse took place on Thursday, January 29, 1953. The moon passed through the center of the Earth's shadow.

Visibility
It could be completely seen from Europe and Africa, seen rising from North and South America, and setting over Asia.

Related lunar eclipses

Lunar year series

Tritos series

Half-Saros cycle
A lunar eclipse will be preceded and followed by solar eclipses by 9 years and 5.5 days (a half saros). This lunar eclipse is related to two total solar eclipses of Solar Saros 130.

See also
List of lunar eclipses
List of 20th-century lunar eclipses

Notes

External links

1953-01
1953-01
1953 in science
January 1953 events